Sauvälja is a village in Tapa Parish, Lääne-Viru County, in northeastern Estonia.

See also
Battle of Porkuni (1944)

References

 

Villages in Lääne-Viru County